In enzymology, an allyl-alcohol dehydrogenase is an enzyme that catalyzes the chemical reaction

allyl alcohol + NADP+  acrolein + NADPH + H+

Thus, the two substrates of this enzyme are allyl alcohol and NADP+, whereas its 3 products are acrolein, NADPH, and H+.

This enzyme belongs to the family of oxidoreductases, specifically those acting on the CH-OH group of donor with NAD+ or NADP+ as acceptor. The systematic name of this enzyme class is allyl-alcohol:NADP+ oxidoreductase.

References

 

EC 1.1.1
NADPH-dependent enzymes
Enzymes of unknown structure